System C Healthcare Limited is a British supplier of health information technology systems and services, based in Maidstone, Kent, specialising in the health and social care sectors. It employs about 525 staff.

Overview 
System C essentially supplies National Health Service organisations. It is involved with one of twelve Global Digital Exemplars at University Hospitals Bristol and Weston NHS Foundation Trust.

Company History 
The company was founded on 21 September 1983 and registered as Mythminster Ltd. The company was renamed several times before being called System C Healthcare Ltd on 3 June 2005.

In June 2005, the company floated on the Alternative Investment Market (AIM).

In 2008, System C acquired Care Records Ltd, a clinical system developer based in Nottingham.

In 2009, System C acquired Liquidlogic Ltd, a company involved in social care information systems.

In 2010, it was named one of the top 100 mid-sized companies to work for in the United Kingdom.

In 2011, System C delisted from AIM and was acquired by McKesson Corporation.

In 2014, System C was acquired by Symphony Technology Group from McKesson Corporation.

In 2015, System C acquired The Learning Clinic. This acquisition was followed in 2016 by the acquisition of Careflow Connect Ltd.

In 2021, CVC Capital Partners acquired System C from Symphony Technology Group.

In July 2021, System C acquired the medicines management software firm WellSky International.

Location 
System C is based at Vinters Park in Maidstone, Kent, United Kingdom.

References

Information technology companies of the United Kingdom
Companies based in Warrington
Electronic health record software